Alejandro Durán Trejo (born January 1, 1993) is a Mexican professional footballer who last played for Gavilanes de Matamoros.

References

1993 births
Living people
Association football midfielders
Chiapas F.C. footballers
Cafetaleros de Chiapas footballers
Tuxtla F.C. footballers
Gavilanes de Matamoros footballers
Liga MX players
Ascenso MX players
Liga Premier de México players
Footballers from Chiapas
Mexican footballers
People from Tuxtla Gutiérrez